Steven Leslie (born 6 February 1976) is a Scottish former footballer who played in the Football League for Stoke City.

Career
Leslie was born in Dumfries. He was on the playing staff for Motherwell and Clydebank before joining  English side Stoke City. He spent the 1994–95 at the Victoria Ground in that time Leslie made two substitute appearances for the "Potters", firstly in the Anglo-Italian Cup against AC Ancona and in the Football League against Portsmouth.

He returned to Scotland and played for hometown club, Queen of the South. He then joined Annan Athletic.

Career statistics
Source:

A.  The "Other" column constitutes appearances and goals in the Anglo-Italian Cup.

References

External links
 

Scottish footballers
Stoke City F.C. players
English Football League players
1976 births
Living people
Queen of the South F.C. players
Annan Athletic F.C. players
Clydebank F.C. (1965) players
Motherwell F.C. players
Scottish Football League players
Association football midfielders
Footballers from Dumfries